Thomas Potter (1689–1777) was an illiterate farmer who in 1760 built a chapel in Good Luck, New Jersey (now Lacey Township), for the purpose of spreading the doctrine of Universalism.

He was born in 1689, the son of Rogerene Baptist immigrants from Rhode Island. Influenced by both Quaker and Baptist beliefs, Potter, as a Universalist, let people of all creeds worship on his land, but was convinced that God would send him a preacher of Universalism. In 1770, a Universalist preacher named John Murray did in fact appear, and was prevailed upon by Potter to give his first Universalist sermon on the American continent. Murray then went on to become the minister of the first Universalist congregation in America, located in Gloucester, Massachusetts, and to be a central figure in the creation of the Universalist Church in America, in 1793. Potter died between 11 May 1777, when he wrote his will, and 2 May 1782, when it was probated. Potter is considered to have been one of the founders of the Universalist movement.  is considered to have been one of the founders of the Universalist movement. Universalists began coming on pilgrimage to the site of his chapel, where in the 1870s they built the Potter Memorial Chapel, and in 1886 created Murray Grove as a center of Universalism. Today Murray Grove is still a Unitarian Universalist retreat and conference center, celebrating the heritage of Potter, Murray and the early Universalists.

External links
Murray Grove Retreat & Conference Center - Thomas Potter farm site
Brown University Charter

Clergy of the Universalist Church of America
Place of birth missing
17th-century Christian universalists
18th-century Christian universalists
American Christian universalists
1689 births
1777 deaths
People from Lacey Township, New Jersey